Canadian diamonds are diamonds which have been mined in any one of the Provinces and territories of Canada. Diamond-rich areas weren't commercially extracted in Canada until the early 1990s. For the first 60 years of the 20th century, diamonds originated from kimberlite pipes and alluvial deposits in places such as Africa and some from South America. Later, diamond discoveries were made in the Soviet Union (now Russia). Since the 1990s, major diamond discoveries were made and mining operations began. Canadian diamonds play a large role in the world market of diamonds.

During the year 2017, Canadian mines produced 23 million carats of diamonds, valued at $2.6 billion. Russia, Botswana, Canada, Democratic Republic of the Congo, and Australia produce over 80% of the world's diamonds. As of 2002, Canada is currently the seventh most important diamond producer by weight and fifth by value.

History of mining 
The Northwest Territories (NWT) has had a long history with resource extraction, from the fur trade to the Klondike gold rush and mineral production. For the last 60 years, the Northwest Territories has turned from hunting land into large scale- resource extraction, such as diamond mining. It was not until 1991 that diamonds were officially discovered by non-indigenous people, specifically, by two geologists named Chuck Fipke and Stewart Blusson. This discovery lead to the first diamond mine in the NWT in 1998 called Ekati and initially operated by BHP Billiton. Later in 2003, Rio Tinto's Diavik Diamond Mine went into commercial production. Later, DeBeers opened the Snap Lake mine in 2008. (It closed in 2016.) Not only did the three mines makes large income, it created many jobs for the Indigenous, approximately 28% of Indigenous were employed by either mines.

During the 19th century, approximately 200 small diamonds had been found across the United States, mostly in Brown and Morgan counties in Indiana. In January 1906, George F. Kunz speculated that these diamonds were glacial erratics that had been transported from an unknown site in Canada.

Chuck Fipke and Stewart Blusson are credited with the discovery of the first diamond mines found in Canada in the mid 1990s. The first diamond rich area they discovered was in Point Lake, but it was quickly determined to be an uneconomical piece of land. Its find though, resulted in the largest diamond staking rushes in the history of mining. This massive search resulted in the discovery of the Ekati Diamond Mine which is home to 156 kimberlite pipes. Fipke and Blusson still share a 20% ownership of the mine, and since its discovery and start of operation in 1998, Ekati has produced over 40 million carats of diamonds. The discovery and later success of this diamond mine caught the attention of other major mining operations, and more massive mines were opened and fully operational within 10 years.

Current mines

Gahcho Kue Diamond Mine

The Gahcho Kue Diamond Mine Project is a Canadian diamond mine located near Kennady Lake, 280 km northeast of Yellowknife, on federal land. The mine is held by the Gahcho Kue Joint Venture (De Beers 51%, Mountain Province Diamonds Inc. 44.1% and Camphor Ventures 4.9%). Officially opened September 20, 2016, Gahcho is one of the richest diamond mines in Canada with a life expectancy of 12 years and a plan to produce over 50 million carats of diamonds. The mine consists of five kimberlites called Tuzo, Hearne, Tesla, Wilson and 5034, where all five are only accessible by helicopter or plane. The Tuzo kimberlite is the deepest part of the mine, abundant in Tuffisitic Kimberlie Breccia. The Hearne kimberlite is the transitional part of the mine, which also dominates in Tuffisitic Kimberlie Breccia. The Wilson kimberlite is located roughly 200 meters east of the Tuzo kimberlite and the Tesla kimberlite is about a kilometre northwest of the Tuzo kimberlite. The Wilson and Tesla kimberlites contain both tuffisitic and hypabyssal kimberlite. Lastly, the 5034 kimberlite is located directly under Kennady Lake, which was also the first kimberlite to be discovered at Gahcho and dominates in Hypabyssal Kimberlite. All five kimberlites have a life expectancy until 2028. A sixth kimberlite, called Curie, was thought to have been discovered in 2018 however this is believed to be connected to the nearby Dunn Sheet so is not thought to be a distinct discovery.

Diavik Mine

The Diavik Diamond Mine is a diamond mine in Lac de Gras, Slave Craton, located about 300 km northeast of Yellowknife. Canada's second mine, first opened in January 2003, is one of the largest open pit diamond mines in the world (according to production) and currently produces around 8 million carats annually. The mine is currently in a transitional shift from open pit mining to underground mining. The mine is a joint venture with Aber Resources Ltd., owning 60% And Kennecott Canada, owning 40%. Diavik Mine is only accessible  by aircraft or temporary “ice roads” during the winter season. Diavik Diamond Mine has four kimberlites on site, called A154 South, A154 North, A418 and A21, where all four kimberlites are located beneath shallow waters. Both A154 South and A154 North are mined by open pit methods which will develop into A418 and A21 kimberlites. Both A418 and A21 are mined underground. These kimberlites plan to have a mining life until 2025.

Ekati Mine
The Ekati Diamond Mine is Canada's first underground diamond operation, located in the Lac de Gras, around 300 km from Yellowknife. Exploration first started in 1981 but officially opened in October 1998. Since the opening until 2017, the mine produced around 67.8 million carats of diamond and is still in production. The mine is owned by Dominion Diamond Mines which first started with six kimberlites, called Beartooth, Fox, Koala, Koala North, Misery, and Panda. There are currently three underground kimberlites (Koala, Koala North, and Panda) and the rest are mined by surface mining. As of 2018, the current pipes which are mined are called Lynx, Pigeon, and Stable, all of which are open pit and Koala remains the only current underground mining. Ekati plans to mine in various pipes until 2042, however there is ongoing exploration and projects associated with the closing date of the mine.

Renard Mine
Renard Diamond Mine is Quebecs first and only diamond mine fully owned by Stornoway, located approximately 250 km north of Chibougamau, Quebec. The mine was first opened in July 2014 and expects to produce around 1.6 million carats of diamond each year, with a mining life of 14 years, ending in 2028. There are currently nine pipes operating at Renard Mine with both open pit and underground mining. Renard Mine does not use chemical in extraction processes nor does is generate acid and metal leachates during processing, decreasing their impact during environmental assessment and reclamation project once mining operations are over.

Snap Lake Mine
Snap Lake Diamond Mine was Canada's first underground diamond mine, located approximately 220 km northeast of Yellowknife, NWT. The mine was owned by De Beers and was their first mine outside of Africa. The mine was only assessable by helicopter, plane and “ice roads” during the winter seasons. The mine first opened in 2008 and produced 1.2 million carats of diamonds. In 2015, De Beers announced closure of the mine due to the decrease in diamond pricing and water issues at the mine.

Victor Mine
Victor Diamond Mine is an open pit diamond mine located in the James Bay Lowlands, approximately 90 km west of Attawapiskat First Nation, Ontario. Victor Mine is Ontario's first diamond mine, which opened in July 2008, owned by De Beers. The mine has produced 7 million carats until its closure, announced early 2019. Environmental monitoring is expected to take around five years with a reclamation plan after the environmental monitoring phase.

Jericho Mine
Jericho Diamond mine is Located 420 km northeast of Yellowknife, Northwest Territories and was Nunavut’s first and only diamond mine. The kimberlite was first discovered in 1994 but was not operated until 2006. Operated by Tahera Diamond Corporation, Jericho produced 780,000 carats but closed in 2008 due to bankruptcy. The mine is currently dormant and has yet to be purchased for further production of diamonds.

Star-Orion Mine 
Star-Orion South Diamond Project is located approximately 60 km east of Prince Albert, Saskatchewan. The project was approved under the Environmental Assessment Act and is fully owned by Star diamond, starting bulk sampling in 2018. The mine plans to have road access all year, and estimates to produced 66 million carats diamonds during the project, which plans to last 38 years.

Environmental assessment 
In Canada, there are currently two different systems which assess the impact of diamond mines. These systems are used as a framework to look at its sustainable development. The first approach is called the triple bottom line (TBL) approach. The TBL approach considers the environmental, economic, and societal impacts of diamond mining. This approach has the benefits of receiving legal attention, unlike the Five Capital (5 CAPS) approach. The 5 CAPS approach includes the natural financial and manufactured capital with humans’ skills and social capital. One of the benefits of using the 5 CAPS approach is that it can be used to compare it to different countries sustainability.

Environmental impacts

Wildlife impacts 

There are major concerns and threats to the wildlife associated with diamond mining. One of the most important mammals in the NWT are the Barren-ground caribou, which are heavily impacted during the construction phases of mining. Caribous play a central role in the cultural life of Indigenous culture and account for half of their meat intake. The process of clearing the land for extraction result in habitat fragmentation, disruption of wildlife corridors, contaminated drinking water, and collisions from vehicles. Due to the high death-rate of the caribous during mining practices, there are ongoing research going into their protection. Management of the caribous include groups such as co-management partners, Indigenous governments and organizations, renewable resource boards and communities.

Another important mammal in the NWT are the grizzly bear. These bears are currently low in population and their reproduction rate is declining. Attention to the status of grizzly bears started in 1995, where reproach to their behaviour, habits, and lifestyle was studied. Bear habitat lost due to mining infrastructure is low but one of the main causes of grizzly death is the attraction of food waste from mines. Practices in reducing food waste and scrapes around the mine can help with the decline in their population.

Lake Health 
One of the biggest threats to lake health occurs once mining operations are over. Many of the current mines in the NWT are located near lakes, which impacts its aquatic life, chemistry, and lake structure. The input of calcium (Ca) from diamond mining activities is an element that is found as a by-product of mining, which changes the chemistry of the lake, specifically its pH. Ekati Mine experiences a change in water chemistry where calcium concentrations increased from 1 mg/L to 30 mg/L. The increase in calcium results in an increase of pH from 7 to 8. Change in pH can restrict the plants and animals which are able to live in that environment.

Post-mining activities cause the runoff of many toxic chemicals in near streams and rivers. Harsh chemicals found in aquatic lake environments can impact aquatic producers (phytoplankton) and primary consumers (zooplankton). The health of species found at the bottom of the food chain determine the health and population of species found at the top of the food chain. The process of the decline of larger species from producers is called bottom-up approach, where species at the bottom of the food chain determine the overall health of the lake. This cascading defect was seen at Ekati Diamond Mine, where lakes near the mine had a decrease in phytoplankton (producers) and zooplankton (primary consumers) where is caused the decrease of larger fish.

See also
 List of diamonds

References

External links
Diamond Mines in Canada

Diamond mines in Canada